The term Voodoo doll commonly describes an effigy into which pins are inserted. Such practices are found in various forms in the magical traditions of many cultures around the world.

Despite its name, the dolls are not prominent in Haitian Vodou and not used in Louisiana Voodoo.

The practise has been denounced and declared irrelevant to Voodoo religion by those in High Priesthood of Louisiana Voodoo.

Depictions in Culture

20th-century link with Voodoo

The link between this magical practice and Voodoo was established through the presentation of the latter in Western popular culture, enduring the first half of the 20th century. In this, the myth of this magical practice being closely linked to Voodoo and Vodou was promoted as part of the wider negative depictions of blacks and Afro-Caribbean religious practices in the United States. In John Houston Craige's 1933 book Black Bagdad: The Arabian Nights Adventures of a Marine Captain in Haiti, he described a Haitian prisoner sticking pins into an effigy to induce illness. Its use also appeared in film representations of Haitian Vodou such as Victor Halperin's 1932 White Zombie and Jacques Tourneur’s 1943 I Walked with a Zombie. Voodoo dolls are also featured in one episode of The Woody Woodpecker Show (1961), as well as in the British musical Lisztomania (1975) and the films Indiana Jones and the Temple of Doom (1984) and The Witches of Eastwick (1987).

By the early 21st century, the image of the voodoo doll had become particularly pervasive. It had become a novelty item available for purchase, with examples being provided in vending machines in British shopping centres, and an article on "How to Make a Voodoo Doll" being included on WikiHow. Voodoo dolls were also featured in the 2009 animated Disney movie The Princess and the Frog.

In 2020, Louisiana Voodoo High Priest Robi Gilmore stated, "It blows my mind that people still believe [Voodoo dolls are relevant to Voodoo religion]. Hollywood really did us a number. We do not stab pins in dolls to hurt people; we don't take your hair and make a doll, and worship the devil with it, and ask the devil to give us black magic to get our revenge on you. It is not done, it won't be done, and it never will exist for us."

See also
 Clay-body
 Myths and misconceptions in Haitian Vodou
 Poppet
 Shikigami
 Totem
 Ushabti
 Haunted doll
 Witchcraft
 Ushi no toki mairi

References

Footnotes

Sources

 

 

 

Dolls
English folklore
Magic items
European witchcraft
Cunning folk
Fiction about Voodoo
American witchcraft